Werner Lempert is a retired East German slalom canoeist who competed in the 1960s. He won two medals at the ICF Canoe Slalom World Championships with a gold in 1965 (Mixed C-2 team) and a silver in 1963 (Mixed C-2). Lempert also served as the general secretary of the German Football Association of the GDR (DFV) between 1974 and 1983.

References

German male canoeists
Possibly living people
Year of birth missing (living people)
Medalists at the ICF Canoe Slalom World Championships